KTZA (92.9 FM) is a radio station broadcasting a Country music format. Licensed to Artesia, New Mexico, United States, the station is currently owned by Pecos Valley Broadcasting Company.

References

External links
 

Country radio stations in the United States
TZA
Radio stations established in 1969